Elizabeth of Bohemia (20 January 1292 – 28 September 1330) was a princess of the Bohemian Přemyslid dynasty who became Queen of Bohemia as the first wife of King John the Blind. She was the mother of Emperor Charles IV, King of Bohemia, and a daughter of Judith of Habsburg, member of the House of Habsburg.

Childhood
She was the daughter of Wenceslaus II of Bohemia and Judith of Habsburg. Her mother died when Elizabeth was five years old, and of her ten children only four of them lived to adulthood: Wenceslaus, Anne, Elizabeth and Margaret. Elizabeth and her siblings also had a half-sister called Agnes. Six years after the death of her mother, her father remarried, to a Polish princess called Elizabeth Richeza, from the Piast dynasty. Elizabeth's father then gained the Crown of Poland.

Many notable events occurred during Elizabeth's youth, including a devastating fire at Prague Castle in 1303, the death of her father, and the assassination of her brother Wenceslaus. Elizabeth was orphaned by the age of thirteen and lived with her sister, Anne. Her other sister, Margaret was married at the age of seven to Bolesław III the Generous, after he had come to the court of Bohemia with his mother, Elisabeth of Greater Poland.

Elizabeth went to live with her aunt Kunigunde in a nunnery near Prague Castle. Without a mother, Elizabeth was strongly influenced by her aunt. Her sister-in-law, Viola of Teschen and her stepmother, Elizabeth Richeza, came to live with Anne and Elizabeth until the relationship between the sisters deteriorated.

The fight for the throne
In 1306, after the murder of Elizabeth's brother Wenceslaus, Elizabeth's brother-in-law Henry became King of Bohemia. Elizabeth was now the only unmarried princess in the family, and at fourteen she was considered a good age to marry, and as a result played an important role in the power struggle for the Kingdom of Bohemia.

The quarrels of the Bohemian throne between Henry of Bohemia and Rudolph of Habsburg resulted in Rudolph taking Bohemia and marrying Queen Elizabeth Richeza. Elizabeth went to live in Prague Castle with her brother's widow, Viola Elisabeth of Cieszyn. However, on Rudolph's death in 1307 the crown returned to her brother-in-law and sister, who wanted Elizabeth to marry the Lord of Bergova (Otto of Löbdaburg) for political reasons. Elizabeth refused to marry Otto and so Elizabeth and Anne fell out with each other.

An opposition group was formed against Henry and Anne, with Elizabeth as the figurehead.

Marriage to John of Luxembourg

Elizabeth married John of Luxembourg, the son of Holy Roman Emperor Henry VII, shortly after his 14th birthday. The wedding took place on 1 September 1310, after John was forced to invade Bohemia. Henry and Anne fled to Carinthia, where Anne died in 1313. The coronation of John and Elizabeth took place on 7 February 1311.

The marriage was initially a disaster, as Elizabeth needed to give birth to a son to prevent the inheritance of the descendants of her sisters, Margaret and Agnes, but did not have a son until six years into the marriage, when she gave birth to Charles IV, Holy Roman Emperor.

The marriage improved for a while as the succession was safely secured, but after a while, Elizabeth grew jealous of John, who had listened to her but whose political opinions differed to hers. In 1319 an alleged plot was uncovered, to depose John and replace him with their eldest son Charles. John had the culprits punished.

John decided to prevent his wife from interfering in the education of their children, and took the three eldest children: Margaret, Bonne, and Charles, from Elizabeth's custody. Queen Elizabeth then lived at Mělník Castle and young Charles was imprisoned by his own father, before being sent to France in 1323, when he was 7 years old. He never saw his mother again.

Later years
In total isolation and abandoned by all, Elizabeth left Bohemia and went to live in exile in Bavaria. Her actions were considered an act of open hostility towards John and his nobles. In exile, Elizabeth gave birth to her last children, twin daughters Anne and Elizabeth. John did not support Elizabeth during her exile. Elizabeth returned to Bohemia in 1325, with her daughter Anne, Elizabeth having died a few months before. When she returned she was ill, but she lived for another five years. Her final years were affected by her lack of finances, which made her unable to maintain a court. She eventually died of tuberculosis in 1330, at the age of thirty-eight.

Children
Elizabeth and John were parents to seven children
 Margaret (8 July 1313 – 11 July 1341, Prague), married in Straubing 12 August 1328 to Henry XIV, Duke of Bavaria
 Bonne (21 May 1315 – 11 September 1349, Maubuisson Abbey, Saint-Ouen-l'Aumône), married in Melun 6 August 1332 to King John II of France
 Charles IV (14 May 1316 – 29 November 1378), King of Bohemia and Holy Roman Emperor
 Přemysl Otakar ("Otto") (22 November 1318 – 20 April 1320), Prince of Bohemia
 John Henry (12 February 1322, Mělník – 12 November 1375), Margrave of Moravia
 Anna (1323 – 3 September 1338), twin of Elisabeth, married 16 February 1335 to Duke Otto of Austria
 Elizabeth (1323–1324)

Ancestry

References

Sources

|-

1292 births
1330 deaths
Přemyslid dynasty
Bohemian queens consort
Bohemian princesses
Burials at St. Vitus Cathedral
Countesses of Luxembourg
Polish princesses
House of Luxembourg
13th-century Bohemian people
13th-century Bohemian women
14th-century Bohemian people
14th-century Bohemian women
14th-century Polish people
14th-century Polish women
14th-century Luxembourgian people
14th-century Luxembourgian women
Daughters of kings